Anthony Myles (born October 16, 1982) is an American former professional basketball player.

Professional career
After going undrafted in the 2004 NBA draft, Myles signed with CB Ciudad de Algeciras of Spain. However, he was released in December 2004. In January 2005, he signed with Banvit B.K. of the Turkish Basketball League for the rest of the season. 
 
He played with the Dongguan New Century of the Chinese Basketball Association from 2005 to 2008. He was leading scorer of CBA in the 2005–06 season. For the 2008–09 season he signed with Ironi Ramat Gan of Israel.

In December 2009, he signed with Steaua Turabo București of the Romanian Basketball Division A for the rest of the 2009–10 season. In October 2010, he signed with Ilysiakos of the Greek Basket League, but was released after only 2 games.

In November 2010, he signed with Crvena zvezda of Serbia. He was released in February 2011. He then signed with the Liaoning Panpan Hunters of China for the rest of the season.

In September 2013, he signed with Argentino de Junín of Argentina for the 2013–14 season. He left them in January 2014.

References

External links
Eurobasket.com profile
FIBA.com profile

1982 births
Living people
ABA League players
African-American basketball players
American expatriate basketball people in Argentina
American expatriate basketball people in China
American expatriate basketball people in Greece
American expatriate basketball people in Israel
American expatriate basketball people in Romania
American expatriate basketball people in Serbia
American expatriate basketball people in Spain
American expatriate basketball people in Turkey
American expatriate basketball people in Uruguay
American men's basketball players
Argentino de Junín basketball players
Bandırma B.İ.K. players
Basketball players from Chicago
Club Malvín basketball players
Ilysiakos B.C. players
Ironi Ramat Gan players
Junior college men's basketball players in the United States
KK Crvena zvezda players
Liaoning Flying Leopards players
Shenzhen Leopards players
Xavier Musketeers men's basketball players
Centers (basketball)
Power forwards (basketball)
21st-century African-American sportspeople
20th-century African-American people